Marcel Béalu was born in Selles-sur-Cher on 30 October 1908, and raised in impoverished circumstances in Saumur. He died on 19 June 1993.

Life
Largely self-taught, he read the classics of canonical French literature on his own initiative while working as a haberdasher in Montargis.  His wife, Marguerite Kessel, encouraged him to read German literature as well.  The grim and cerebral atmosphere of German Romantic literature would make itself felt in his style.

In 1937, Marcel Béalu met cubist poet Max Jacob, who gave him critical encouragement and advice.

In 1951, Marcel Béalu set himself up in business as a Parisian bookseller.  He named his store, after a comment on his work by Jean Paulhan, Le Pont Traversé, or "the Crossed Bridge."  The store, which sold all manner of strange works in addition to the more familiar bookshop fare, moved several times, at one time into a former butcher's shop at 62 rue de Vaugirard.  One of his first customers was pre-eminent French psychoanalyst, Jacques Lacan, who purchased a complete edition of Shakespeare — for which he never paid.

Marcel Béalu is most consistently associated with the literature of the fantastic, and in particular with the characteristically French  strain of imaginative writing.  He was intrigued by the equivocal relationship of fantasy or dream to reality, the uncertainty of reality as a distinct property or mode of being, and his fiction was widely hailed for its dreamlike qualities.  While his work was fantastic, it did not reflect a reductive Freudian idea of fantasy as a mere substitute for the banal.  His predilection for cramped, seedy, confusing and confining spaces, and for irregularities and repetitions in time, prompted some readers to compare his work with Kafka's.

In 1955, he and Rene Rougerie founded the journal Réalités secrètes, which endured until 1963.  Julien Gracq, Jean Paulhan, A. Pieyre de Mandiargues, Charles Nodier, J.M.A. Paroutaud, and Jacques Sternberg were among the authors to appear in the first issue alone.  Béalu did not publish a great deal of his own material in the magazine, in part because he chose to be a marginal, remote figure.  And he painted, his visual work being another translation of the unreal as was his poetry and fiction.

His writing was admired by Jean Paulhan and Antonin Artaud, but as yet his literary reputation has not fully developed.  Only one of his works, L’Expérience de la nuit, has been translated into English (by Christine Donougher, as The Experience of the Night).

Novels and collections

L’Expérience de la nuit, Éditions Gallimard.
Journal d’un mort, Gallimard.
L’Araignée d’eau, Les Lettres.
Contes du demi-sommeil, Éditions Phébus.
L’Aventure Impersonnelle, Arcanes.
Passage de la bête, Belfond.
La Grande Marée, Belfond.
La Poudre des songes, Belfond.
La Mort à Benidorm, Fanlac.
Le Bruit du moulin, José Corti.
Mémoire de l’ombre, Phébus.
L’Amateur de devinettes, La Différence.
Le Vif, Calligrammes.

Poetry

Poèmes 1936–1960 (Le Pont Traversé).
Poèmes 1960–1980 (Le Pont Traversé).
Choix de poèmes (Seghers).
Erreros (Fata Morgana).
Les Cent meilleures pages de Marcel Béalu, (Belfond).
La Paix du regard sans désir (José Corti).

Plays

L’Homme abîmé (Rougerie).
La Dernière scène (Rougerie).
La Femme en cage (Rougerie).

Essays and correspondence

Dernier visage de Max Jacob (Editions Ouvrières).
Le Bien rêver (Robert Morel).
Anthologie de la poésie française depuis le surréalisme (de Beaune).
Anthologie de la poésie féminine française de 1900 à nos jours (Stock).
La Poésie érotique en France (Seghers).
Le Chapeau magique, essai d’autobiographie, 3 volumes : Enfances et apprentissage – Porte ouverte sur la rue – Présent définitif.
 (Rougerie).

Dedicated journals

Noah, number 5, 1980.
Poésie 87, number 18.
Béalu à Nîmes, Bibliothèque Municipale de Nîmes.
Luc Vidal, Entretiens avec Marcel Béalu, Nantes, Signes, 1985.

Marcel Béalu's work has appeared in la Nouvelle Revue Francaise, l’Herne, Poésie 44, La Tour de Feu, Les Lettres, Fiction, La Tour Saint-Jacques, Botteghe Oscure, Dire, Marginales, Les Cahiers du Sud, Betelgeuse.

A film adaptation of L’Araignée d’eau was produced in 1968 by Jean-Daniel Verhaeghe, as interpreted by Elisabeth Wiener, Dutheil Marie-Angel and Marc Eyraud.

Short animated film by Lys Flowerday after a text by Marcel Béalu. Narration by the author.
"Petite Jeune Fille dans Paris" / A Slip of a Girl in Paris ( Contes du demi-sommeil, Editions Phebus ).
10 min. 35 mm colour, . Production La Fabrique, Arte, CNC and DRAC Languedoc Roussillon 1993
Grand Prix — Festival National du Film d’Animation Marly Le Roi 1994
Special Design Prize — Zagreb Animation Festival 1994
Second Animation Prize — Dresden Short Film Festival 1995
Visible at The Forum des Images, Paris, in the Collection Paris.

A radio adaptation of Le Bruit du Moulin was broadcast in 1966, with Edith Scob and Jean Topart.

External link to article:  

1908 births
1993 deaths
20th-century French non-fiction writers
20th-century French male writers
French fantasy writers
Prix Guillaume Apollinaire winners